The Bruges dialect (Standard Dutch and West Flemish: Brugs) is a West Flemish dialect used in Bruges. It is rapidly declining, being replaced with what scholars call general (rural) West Flemish.

Phonology

Consonants
 After , the sequence  is realized as a velar nasal .
 The sequence  is realized as a sequence , rather than a syllabic .

Realization of 
In the neighbouring rural area, an alveolar  is used.

The other alveolar realizations include: a voiceless alveolar trill , a partially devoiced alveolar trill , a voiceless alveolar fricative tap/trill , a voiceless alveolar/postalveolar fricative  (the least common realization), a voiced alveolar/postalveolar fricative  and a voiced alveolar approximant .

Among the uvular realizations, he lists a voiced uvular trill , a voiced uvular fricative trill , a voiced uvular fricative  and a voiced uvular approximant , among which the uvular fricative trill is the most common realization.

Vowels

 In comparison with Standard Dutch, the short front vowels underwent a chain shift, so that the standard  became .
 Among the back vowels,  are rounded, whereas  are unrounded.
  are near-close ;  is fully front, whereas  is fully back.
  (but not ) are rather weakly rounded .
 Phonetically,  are mid , whereas  are open-mid .
This feature is typical of working class speech and is nearly extinct.

 All of the diphthongs are falling.
  used to be pronounced as monophthongs , a realization which is rapidly regaining popularity among younger speakers.

References

Bibliography

 
 
 
 

Dutch dialects
Languages of Belgium
Bruges